Frederick Douglass Holliday also was known as Fred Holliday and Dr. Holliday (1927, Philadelphia - January 26, 1985, Cleveland) was an American school superintendent, small airplane pilot, education advocate, a former teacher, and former director of the York County Foundation.

Background 
Holliday was a graduate from Harvard University and Tiffin University where he received his doctorate in education. He was superintendent in Plainfield, New Jersey, New York City Schools, York City Schools, and Cleveland Metropolitan School District.

In 1975, Holliday gave a speech to community leaders addressing racial injustice and oppression at Crispus Attucks Community Center in Lancaster, PA. The time he delivered the speech he was serving as district head of York City Schools. Holliday became superintendent of Cleveland Schools in September 1982 becoming its first African-American superintendent. He improved the attendance and graduation rate, safety and helped integrate busing. He advocated modern technology installed in every school. He was a certified pilot that enjoyed flying his private plane at the aviation high school near Burke Lakefront Airport. He was known as a disciplinarian with an ebullient personality.

Holliday became depressed when he found that his contract would be extended one year instead of three along with excessive bureaucracy and racial issues within the system. He committed suicide on Saturday, January 26, 1985. In a typewritten suicide note, he blamed petty politics and greed of the board for his feelings of hopelessness.        

York County Community Foundation had established a fund in Holliday's memory in 1993. 

Holliday is buried at Rolling Green Memorial Park in Chester County, Pennsylvania.

References 

Harvard Graduate School of Education alumni
Tiffin University alumni
Education in Cleveland
Burials in Pennsylvania
1927 births
1985 suicides
Suicides by firearm in Ohio
Educators from Philadelphia
School superintendents in Pennsylvania
School superintendents in New York (state)
School superintendents in Ohio
School superintendents in New Jersey